The Portage Bridge crosses the Ottawa River just down-river from the Chaudière Bridge, joining the communities of Gatineau, Quebec and Ottawa, Ontario. It links Laurier Street and Alexandre-Taché Boulevard in the Hull sector of Gatineau and Wellington Street at the Garden of the Provinces and Territories in Ottawa, crossing Victoria Island and the former Philemon Island on the way.

The bridge was built by the National Capital Commission in 1973 and expanded in 1988. The bridge is named after the historic Portage Trail around the Chaudière Falls and Rapids which ended near the present location of the bridge.

History

Recent improvements
On March 30, 2019, construction work began which includes improving safety of the bidirectional cycle track, adjustment to the motor vehicle lanes to accommodate the cycle track, repairs to the drains and the bridge expansion joints, and the asphalt surface of the bridge's northbound HOV lane.

See also 
 List of bridges in Canada
 List of bridges in Ottawa
 List of crossings of the Ottawa River

References

External links 
Transport Canada

Bridges in Gatineau
Bridges in Ottawa
Bridges completed in 1973
Bridges over the Ottawa River
Road bridges in Ontario
Road bridges in Quebec
National Capital Commission
1973 establishments in Ontario
1973 establishments in Quebec